Chézy-sur-Marne (literally Chézy on Marne) is a commune in the Aisne department in Hauts-de-France in northern France.

2009 flood
The town was hit by a flash flood and mudslide on 14 June 2009 after a violent localised storm.  Cars were floated downstream, cellars and ground-floor rooms in low-lying houses were flooded. Adjacent localities were also affected.

Population

See also
Communes of the Aisne department
Académie Charles Cros

References

Communes of Aisne
Aisne communes articles needing translation from French Wikipedia